Rocket frog is a common name for many species of frog, it may refer to 
 Litoria dorsalis, Dwarf Rocket Frog 
 Litoria inermis, Bumpy Rocket Frog
 Litoria freycineti, Wallum Rocket Frog
 Litoria longirostris, Scrub Rocket Frog
 Litoria nasuta, Striped Rocket Frog 
 Litoria watjulumensis, Giant or Large rocketfrog
 Colostethus flotator, Rainforest Rocket Frog
 Colostethus jacobuspetersi, Quito Rocket Frog
 Colostethus nubicola, Boquete Rocket Frog
 Colostethus panamensis, Common Rocket Frog

Rocket frog may also refer to
 FROG rockets, a term for FROG-7

See also
 Orbiting Frog Otolith
 Animals in space

Animal common name disambiguation pages